Vladimir Vujović (born 23 July 1982) is a Montenegrin professional football coach and former player.

Club career

Mogren
Vujović started playing in his home-town club FK Mogren. He made his debut as senior by making two appearances for Mogren in the 1999–2000 First League of FR Yugoslavia. Mogren ended the season 19th in the league and got relegated. That ended up opening way for Vujović to become a regular starter for Mogren in the following season when playing in the 2000–01 Second League of FR Yugoslavia (20 appearances). Mogren performed well and finished third, however it was not enough for promotion back to the national top-level.

Beograd
His regular exhibitions called the attention of the clubs from the capital, Belgrade, and that summer 2001 he moved to another club playing in the Second League, FK Beograd.

Petrovac
Vujović was a regular and after a year and a half he decided to leave the capital and return to Montenegro, this time signing with Second League side OFK Petrovac.

Sutjeska Nikšić
He was now closer to the eyes of the scouts of the strongest Montenegrin clubs playing in the First League, and half season at Petrovac was enough to earn him a move to FK Sutjeska Nikšić which had just ended the 2002–03 season of the FR Yugoslav First League at fourth place. It was summer 2003 and Vujović was now back to the First League of FR Yugoslavia but this time as more experienced player. Vujović was a regular starter in the squad of Sutjeska, however the club failed to repeat the great performance of the earlier season and finished eighth.

Pobeda
Sutjeska was performing even worse in 2004–05 and by the winter-break Vujović decided to move and signed with Macedonian side FK Pobeda. It ended being a right choice as Sutjeska ended the season in a relegation spot, while his new club, Pobeda, grabbed a European competition spot by finishing third in the 2004–05 Macedonian First League. Vujović contributed with 5 goals in the 14 games he played that half-season. By then Pobeda was a regular among the top Macedonian clubs, and next season they finished fourth.

Al Wehda
In summer 2006 he made his first move to Asia by signing with Saudi Arabian club Al-Wehda Mecca. Vujović scored 6 goals in 28 appearances helping the Mecca club to finish third in the 2006–07 Saudi Premier League. At that time Montenegro had become independent and formed its own national team. Vujović was among those who received the first call ever to the Montenegrin national team, and played the three first games of Montenegro in its history.

Return to Mogren
In summer 2007 Vujović left Saudi Arabia and returned home. He joined FK Mogren and played with them in the second edition of the Montenegrin First League as national top-flight. However he will not stay long home. He left Mogren at the winter-break of the 2007–08 Montenegrin First League.

Luch Vladivostok
Back then Russia had its leagues taking place during calendar years, and at beginning of 2008 Vujović was target of FC Luch Vladivostok as their reinforcement for the 2008 Russian Premier League. The club from Vladivostok performed below expectations and ended the season relegated.

Vasas
It meant most of the best players were free to go, and so did Vujović, he left Russia and joined Hungarian side Vasas SC. He played with Vasas the second half of the 2008–09 Nemzeti Bajnokság I. Vasas finished 10th and failed to reach a European spot.

Second return to Mogren
Vujović left Budapest heading home again and returning to FK Mogren. Mogren's third place in the 2009–10 Montenegrin First League was not enough for his ambitions, and the following couple of years will justify once more the label of football globetrotter of Vujović.

Vostok
His experience in the Russian Premier League was a good recommendation for Kazakh side FC Vostok who were newly promoted in the 2011 Kazakhstan Premier League. However the team was not balanced enough to survive at Kazakh elite, and finished bottom and relegated.

Al Ahed
Vujović moved this time to Beirut, where he joined Al Ahed FC and finished third in the 2011–12 Lebanese Premier League.

Shenyang Shenbei
Already in Asia, Vujović next stop was to be China. He signed with Shenyang Shenbei and played with them the entire season of 2012 China League One. His club failed promotion to the Chinese top-league.

Petrovac
Vujović was back home where he played with OFK Petrovac the first half of the 2013–14 Montenegrin First League.

Persib Bandung
He was signed by Persib Bandung on 11 December 2013.

Bhayangkara
On 8 December 2018, he officially announced his retirement from professional football.

International career
Vujović made his debut for Montenegro in his country's first ever competitive match on 24 March 2007, a friendly against Hungary in Podgorica. He has earned a total of 3 caps, scoring no goals. His final international was a June 2007 Kirin Cup match against Colombia.

Managerial career
On 16 January 2019, one month after his retirement as a football player, Vladimir was appointed as head coach of Bogor FC in Liga 2, and after two months he leave Bogor with all 22 players to club PSIM Yogyakarta based on mutual consent. He resigned as a coach of PSIM on 9 July 2019.

On 1 June 2021, Vujović signed a one-year deal as head coach of Lebanese Second Division club Salam Zgharta. He helped them again promotion to the Lebanese Premier League.

After a successful season in Lebanon, where he promoted Salam Zgharta back to the Lebanese Premier League, on September 1, 2022, Vladimir Vujovic returned to Indonesia, signing a three-year contract with Indonesian Liga 1 team Borneo FC as a Technical Director.

Career statistics

Managerial

Honours

Player
Persib Bandung
 Indonesia Super League: 2014
 President's Cup: 2015

Mogren
 Montenegrin Cup: 2008

Al Ahed
 Lebanese Elite Cup: 2011
 Lebanese Super Cup: 2011

Manager
Salam Zgharta
 Lebanese Second Division: 2021 Runner-up

References

External links
 

1982 births
Living people
People from Budva
Association football central defenders
Serbia and Montenegro footballers
Montenegrin footballers
Montenegro international footballers
FK Mogren players
FK Beograd players
OFK Petrovac players
FK Sutjeska Nikšić players
FK Pobeda players
SC Tavriya Simferopol players
Al-Wehda Club (Mecca) players
FC Luch Vladivostok players
Vasas SC players
FC Vostok players
Al Ahed FC players
Shenyang Zhongze F.C. players
Persib Bandung players
Bhayangkara F.C. players
First League of Serbia and Montenegro players
Second League of Serbia and Montenegro players
Macedonian First Football League players
Saudi Professional League players
Russian Premier League players
Nemzeti Bajnokság I players
Kazakhstan Premier League players
Lebanese Premier League players
China League One players
Indonesian Super League-winning players
Serbia and Montenegro expatriate footballers
Expatriate footballers in North Macedonia
Serbia and Montenegro expatriate sportspeople in North Macedonia
Montenegrin expatriate footballers
Expatriate footballers in Saudi Arabia
Montenegrin expatriate sportspeople in Saudi Arabia
Expatriate footballers in Russia
Montenegrin expatriate sportspeople in Russia
Expatriate footballers in Hungary
Montenegrin expatriate sportspeople in Hungary
Expatriate footballers in Kazakhstan
Montenegrin expatriate sportspeople in Kazakhstan
Expatriate footballers in Lebanon
Montenegrin expatriate sportspeople in Lebanon
Expatriate footballers in China
Montenegrin expatriate sportspeople in China
Expatriate footballers in Indonesia
Montenegrin expatriate sportspeople in Indonesia
Montenegrin football managers
Expatriate football managers in Indonesia
Expatriate football managers in Lebanon
Salam Zgharta FC managers
Lebanese Second Division managers